The 2022 FIFA World Cup is the 22nd edition of the FIFA World Cup.

2022 World Cup may also refer to:

Association football 
2021 FIFA Club World Cup (held in early 2022)
2022 FIFA Club World Cup (held in early 2023)
2022 FIFA U-20 Women's World Cup
2022 FIFA U-17 Women's World Cup

Baseball
2022 U-23 Baseball World Cup

Basketball 
2022 FIBA Under-17 Basketball World Cup
2022 FIBA Under-17 Women's Basketball World Cup
2022 FIBA Women's Basketball World Cup

Cricket 
2022 ICC Men's T20 World Cup
2022 Women's Cricket World Cup

Field hockey
2022 Women's FIH Hockey Junior World Cup
2022 Women's FIH Hockey World Cup

Indoor hockey
2022 Men's FIH Indoor Hockey World Cup
2022 Women's FIH Indoor Hockey World Cup

Rugby league
2021 Men's Rugby League World Cup
2021 Women's Rugby League World Cup
2021 Wheelchair Rugby League World Cup
2021 Physical Disability Rugby League World Cup

Rugby union
2021 Rugby World Cup

Shooting
 2022 ISSF World Cup

Winter sports
2021–22 Biathlon World Cup
2021–22 FIS Alpine Ski World Cup
2021–22 FIS Cross-Country World Cup